Mahdi Houssein Mahabeh (born on 20 December 1995) is a Djiboutian professional footballer who plays as a forward for Arta/Solar7 and the Djibouti national team.

International career
Mahabeh debuted internationally on 3 June 2016 in a 2017 African Cup of Nations qualifier and scored his first goal for Djibouti in a 4–3 away loss against Ethiopia.

Mahabeh also appeared in the 2021 Africa Cup of Nations qualification as he scored a penalty goal against Gambia resulting a draw at 1–1.

Career statistics

International goals
Scores and results list Djibouti's goal tally first.

References

1995 births
Living people
Djiboutian footballers
Association football forwards
AS Ali Sabieh/Djibouti Télécom players
Djibouti Premier League players
Djibouti international footballers
AS Arta/Solar7 players